Rahjerd (also Romanized as Rāhjerd; also known as Rājerd and Rājird) is a village in Shur Dasht Rural District, Shara District, Hamadan County, Hamadan Province, Iran. At the 2006 census, its population was 512, in 102 families.

References 

Populated places in Hamadan County